The Central District of Kharameh County is a district (bakhsh) in Kharameh County, Fars Province, Iran. At the 2006 census, its population was 57,372, in 13,731 families.  The District has two cities: Kharameh & Soltan Shahr. The District has four rural districts (dehestan): Dehqanan Rural District, Kheyrabad Rural District, Korbal Rural District, and Sofla Rural District.

References 

Kharameh County
Districts of Fars Province